The 13th constituency of Bouches-du-Rhône is a French legislative constituency in Bouches-du-Rhône.

Deputies

Elections

2022

 
 
 
 
 
 
 
|-
| colspan="8" bgcolor="#E9E9E9"|
|-

2017

2012

|- style="background-color:#E9E9E9;text-align:center;"
! colspan="2" rowspan="2" style="text-align:left;" | Candidate
! rowspan="2" colspan="2" style="text-align:left;" | Party
! colspan="2" | 1st round
! colspan="2" | 2nd round
|- style="background-color:#E9E9E9;text-align:center;"
! width="75" | Votes
! width="30" | %
! width="75" | Votes
! width="30" | %
|-
| style="background-color:" |
| style="text-align:left;" | Gaby Charroux
| style="text-align:left;" | Left Front
| FG
| 
| 27.41%
| 
| 60.28%
|-
| style="background-color:" |
| style="text-align:left;" | René Raimondi
| style="text-align:left;" | Socialist Party
| PS
| 
| 24.82%
|colspan="2" style="text-align:left;" | WITHDREW
|-
| style="background-color:" |
| style="text-align:left;" | Béatrix Espallardo
| style="text-align:left;" | Front National
| FN
| 
| 21.69%
| 
| 39.72%
|-
| style="background-color:" |
| style="text-align:left;" | Michèle Vasserot
| style="text-align:left;" | Union for a Popular Movement
| UMP
| 
| 14.77%
| colspan="2" style="text-align:left;" |
|-
| style="background-color:" |
| style="text-align:left;" | Paul Lombard
| style="text-align:left;" | Miscellaneous Left
| DVG
| 
| 4.04%
| colspan="2" style="text-align:left;" |
|-
| style="background-color:" |
| style="text-align:left;" | Véronique Coulomb
| style="text-align:left;" | Europe Ecology – The Greens
| EELV
| 
| 1.99%
| colspan="2" style="text-align:left;" |
|-
| style="background-color:" |
| style="text-align:left;" | Anne Zakarian
| style="text-align:left;" | New Centre-Presidential Majority
| NCE
| 
| 1.96%
| colspan="2" style="text-align:left;" |
|-
| style="background-color:" |
| style="text-align:left;" | Adil Fajry
| style="text-align:left;" | Far Left
| EXG
| 
| 1.28%
| colspan="2" style="text-align:left;" |
|-
| style="background-color:" |
| style="text-align:left;" | Dominique Laumonier
| style="text-align:left;" | Ecologist
| ECO
| 
| 0.75%
| colspan="2" style="text-align:left;" |
|-
| style="background-color:" |
| style="text-align:left;" | Roland Larivier
| style="text-align:left;" | Far Right
| EXD
| 
| 0.62%
| colspan="2" style="text-align:left;" |
|-
| style="background-color:" |
| style="text-align:left;" | Monique Guyonnaud-Meugnot
| style="text-align:left;" | Miscellaneous Right
| DVD
| 
| 0.37%
| colspan="2" style="text-align:left;" |
|-
| style="background-color:" |
| style="text-align:left;" | Anne Roche
| style="text-align:left;" | Far Left
| EXG
| 
| 0.31%
| colspan="2" style="text-align:left;" |
|-
| colspan="8" style="background-color:#E9E9E9;"|
|- style="font-weight:bold"
| colspan="4" style="text-align:left;" | Total
| 
| 100%
| 
| 100%
|-
| colspan="8" style="background-color:#E9E9E9;"|
|-
| colspan="4" style="text-align:left;" | Registered voters
| 
| style="background-color:#E9E9E9;"|
| 
| style="background-color:#E9E9E9;"|
|-
| colspan="4" style="text-align:left;" | Blank/Void ballots
| 
| 1.39%
| 
| 4.91%
|-
| colspan="4" style="text-align:left;" | Turnout
| 
| 59.69%
| 
| 57.63%
|-
| colspan="4" style="text-align:left;" | Abstentions
| 
| 40.31%
| 
| 42.37%
|-
| colspan="8" style="background-color:#E9E9E9;"|
|- style="font-weight:bold"
| colspan="6" style="text-align:left;" | Result
| colspan="2" style="background-color:" | FG GAIN FROM PCF
|}

2007

|- style="background-color:#E9E9E9;text-align:center;"
! colspan="2" rowspan="2" style="text-align:left;" | Candidate
! rowspan="2" colspan="2" style="text-align:left;" | Party
! colspan="2" | 1st round
! colspan="2" | 2nd round
|- style="background-color:#E9E9E9;text-align:center;"
! width="75" | Votes
! width="30" | %
! width="75" | Votes
! width="30" | %
|-
| style="background-color:" |
| style="text-align:left;" | Michel Vaxès
| style="text-align:left;" | Communist
| PCF
| 
| 30.47%
| 
| 56.03%
|-
| style="background-color:" |
| style="text-align:left;" | Alain Aragneau
| style="text-align:left;" | Union for a Popular Movement
| UMP
| 
| 32.74%
| 
| 43.97%
|-
| style="background-color:" |
| style="text-align:left;" | René Raimondi
| style="text-align:left;" | Socialist Party
| PS
| 
| 15.07%
| colspan="2" style="text-align:left;" |
|-
| style="background-color:" |
| style="text-align:left;" | José Rodriguez
| style="text-align:left;" | Front National
| FN
| 
| 5.58%
| colspan="2" style="text-align:left;" |
|-
| style="background-color:" |
| style="text-align:left;" | Jean Fayolle
| style="text-align:left;" | Democratic Movement
| MoDem
| 
| 4.55%
| colspan="2" style="text-align:left;" |
|-
| style="background-color:" |
| style="text-align:left;" | Dominique Laumonier
| style="text-align:left;" | Ecologist
| ECO
| 
| 2.29%
| colspan="2" style="text-align:left;" |
|-
| style="background-color:" |
| style="text-align:left;" | Dany Sans
| style="text-align:left;" | Independent
| DIV
| 
| 2.23%
| colspan="2" style="text-align:left;" |
|-
| style="background-color:" |
| style="text-align:left;" | Géraldine Grimaud
| style="text-align:left;" | Far Left
| EXG
| 
| 1.92%
| colspan="2" style="text-align:left;" |
|-
| style="background-color:" |
| style="text-align:left;" | Salim Djerari
| style="text-align:left;" | Independent
| DIV
| 
| 1.01%
| colspan="2" style="text-align:left;" |
|-
| style="background-color:" |
| style="text-align:left;" | Marie-Christine Pinard
| style="text-align:left;" | Hunting, Fishing, Nature, Traditions
| CPNT
| 
| 0.98%
| colspan="2" style="text-align:left;" |
|-
| style="background-color:" |
| style="text-align:left;" | Claude Donjerkovic
| style="text-align:left;" | Movement for France
| MPF
| 
| 0.77%
| colspan="2" style="text-align:left;" |
|-
| style="background-color:" |
| style="text-align:left;" | Hervé Guerrera
| style="text-align:left;" | Regionalist
| REG
| 
| 0.75%
| colspan="2" style="text-align:left;" |
|-
| style="background-color:" |
| style="text-align:left;" | Roland Lariviere
| style="text-align:left;" | Far Right
| EXD
| 
| 0.65%
| colspan="2" style="text-align:left;" |
|-
| style="background-color:" |
| style="text-align:left;" | Anne Roche
| style="text-align:left;" | Far Left
| EXG
| 
| 0.59%
| colspan="2" style="text-align:left;" |
|-
| style="background-color:" |
| style="text-align:left;" | Michel Gayvallet
| style="text-align:left;" | Independent
| DIV
| 
| 0.40%
| colspan="2" style="text-align:left;" |
|-
| style="background-color:" |
| style="text-align:left;" | Christophe Vivaldi
| style="text-align:left;" | Miscellaneous Right
| DVD
| 
| 0.00%
| colspan="2" style="text-align:left;" |
|-
| colspan="8" style="background-color:#E9E9E9;"|
|- style="font-weight:bold"
| colspan="4" style="text-align:left;" | Total
| 
| 100%
| 
| 100%
|-
| colspan="8" style="background-color:#E9E9E9;"|
|-
| colspan="4" style="text-align:left;" | Registered voters
| 
| style="background-color:#E9E9E9;"|
| 
| style="background-color:#E9E9E9;"|
|-
| colspan="4" style="text-align:left;" | Blank/Void ballots
| 
| 1.89%
| 
| 3.13%
|-
| colspan="4" style="text-align:left;" | Turnout
| 
| 60.06%
| 
| 60.23%
|-
| colspan="4" style="text-align:left;" | Abstentions
| 
| 39.94%
| 
| 39.77%
|-
| colspan="8" style="background-color:#E9E9E9;"|
|- style="font-weight:bold"
| colspan="6" style="text-align:left;" | Result
| colspan="2" style="background-color:" | PCF HOLD
|}

2002

 
 
 
 
 
|-
| colspan="8" bgcolor="#E9E9E9"|
|-

1997

 
 
 
 
 
 
|-
| colspan="8" bgcolor="#E9E9E9"|
|-

References

13